The European Union Referendum (Conduct) Regulations 2016 (No. 219) is a Statutory Instrument of the Parliament of the United Kingdom that made legal provisions under the provisions of the European Union Referendum Act 2015 regarding the Conduct and procedure of the referendum that was to be held across the United Kingdom and Gibraltar on the issue of  continued membership of the European Union as well as regulations regarding the publications of notices, the form of the ballet paper and also notices for within the Polling Stations on Polling day. The Statutory Instrument was made  immediately following the public announcement by the then Conservative Prime Minister David Cameron that the referendum was to be held on Thursday 23 June 2016 on Saturday 20 February 2016 and it came into force on 26 February 2016.

See also
 2016 United Kingdom European Union membership referendum
 The European Union Referendum (Date of Referendum etc.) Regulations 2016
 European Union Referendum Act 2015

References

2016 in British law
2016 United Kingdom European Union membership referendum
Referendums in the United Kingdom
Statutory Instruments of the United Kingdom